The 1966 ECAC Hockey Men's Ice Hockey Tournament was the 5th tournament in league history. It was played between March 8 and March 12, 1966. Quarterfinal games were played at home team campus sites, while the 'final four' games were played at the Boston Arena in Boston, Massachusetts. By reaching the championship game Clarkson was indeed invited to participate in the 1966 NCAA University Division Men's Ice Hockey Tournament. As runner-up, Cornell received the second bid to the tournament, however, due to a disagreement between the Ivy League and the NCAA on postseason participation the Big Red declined the invitation and were replaced by Boston University.

Format
The tournament featured three rounds of play, all of which were single-elimination. The top eight teams, based on conference rankings, qualified to participate in the tournament. In the quarterfinals the first seed and eighth seed, the second seed and seventh seed, the third seed and sixth seed and the fourth seed and fifth seed played against one another. In the semifinals, the winner of the first and eighth matchup played the winner of the fourth and fifth matchup while the other two remaining teams played with the winners advancing to the championship game and the losers advancing to the third place game.

Conference standings
Note: GP = Games played; W = Wins; L = Losses; T = Ties; Pct. = Winning percentage; GF = Goals for; GA = Goals against

Bracket

Note: * denotes overtime period(s)

Quarterfinals

(1) Clarkson vs. (8) Colgate

(2) Boston University vs. (7) Northeastern

(3) Cornell vs. (6) Boston College

(4) Brown vs. (5) St. Lawrence

Semifinals

(1) Clarkson vs. (4) Brown

(2) Boston University vs. (3) Cornell

Third Place

(2) Boston University vs. (4) Brown

Championship

(1) Clarkson vs. (3) Cornell

Tournament awards

All-Tournament Team

First Team
F Harry Dunn (Clarkson)
F Tom Hurley (Clarkson)
F Doug Ferguson (Cornell)
D Harry Orr (Cornell)
D Bob Gaudreau (Brown)
G Terry Yurkiewicz* (Clarkson)
* Most Outstanding Player(s)

Second Team
F Mike Doran (Cornell)
F Fred Bassi (Boston University)
F Dave Ferguson (Cornell)
D Tom Ross (Boston University)
D Gary Patterson (Clarkson)
G Dave Ferguson (Brown)

References

External links
ECAC Hockey
1965–66 ECAC Hockey Standings
1965–66 NCAA Standings

ECAC Hockey Men's Ice Hockey Tournament
ECAC tournament